1030 Vitja, provisional designation , is a dark background asteroid from the outer regions of the asteroid belt, approximately  in diameter. It was discovered on 25 May 1924, by Soviet–Russian astronomer Vladimir Albitsky at the Simeiz Observatory on the Crimean peninsula. The asteroid was named in honor of Viktor Zaslavskij (1925–1944), a relative of the discoverer.

Orbit and classification 

Vitja is a non-family asteroid from the main belt's background population. It orbits the Sun in the outer asteroid belt at a distance of 2.7–3.5 AU once every 5 years and 6 months (2,014 days; semi-major axis of 3.12 AU). Its orbit has an eccentricity of 0.12 and an inclination of 15° with respect to the ecliptic. The asteroid's first recorded observation was made a week after its official discovery at Heidelberg Observatory in June 1924, while its observation arc begins more than seven years later at Lowell Observatory in October 1931.

Naming 

This minor planet was named by the discoverer after his relative Viktor "Vitja" Viktorovich Zaslavskij (1925–1944), who died during World War II. He was the nephew of Spiridon Zaslavskij, the brother-in-law of the discoverer, after whom the asteroid 1330 Spiridonia was later named. No accurate naming citation was given for this asteroid in The Names of the Minor Planets. The author of the Dictionary of Minor Planets, Lutz Schmadel, researched the naming circumstances himself.

Physical characteristics 

Vitja has been characterized as a primitive P-type and carbonaceous C-type asteroid by the Wide-field Infrared Survey Explorer (WISE) and Pan-STARRS photometric survey, respectively. The Collaborative Asteroid Lightcurve Link (CALL) assumes it to be a very dark C-type asteroid.

Rotation period 

In July 2007, a rotational lightcurve of Vitja was obtained from photometric observations by French amateur astronomer René Roy. Lightcurve analysis gave a rotation period of 5.7014 hours and a brightness variation of 0.18 magnitude. Another observation by Andrea Ferrero at the Bigmuskie Observatory  in Italy showed a period of 6.332 with an amplitude of 0.21.

Diameter and albedo 

CALL adopts the results obtained by IRAS, that is, an albedo of 0.0326 and a diameter of  based on an absolute magnitude of 10.3.

Between 2007 and 2021, 1030 Vitja has been observed to occult four stars.

References

External links 
 Lightcurve Database Query (LCDB), at www.minorplanet.info
 Dictionary of Minor Planet Names, Google books
 Asteroids and comets rotation curves, CdR – Geneva Observatory, Raoul Behrend
 Discovery Circumstances: Numbered Minor Planets (1)-(5000) – Minor Planet Center
 
 

001030
Discoveries by Vladimir Albitsky
Named minor planets
19240525